Taxodium distichum (bald cypress, swamp cypress; ;
cipre in Louisiana) is a deciduous conifer in the family Cupressaceae. It is native to the southeastern United States. Hardy and tough, this tree adapts to a wide range of soil types, whether wet, salty, dry, or swampy. It is noted for the russet-red fall color of its lacy needles.

This plant has some cultivated varieties and is often used in groupings in public spaces. Common names include bald cypress, swamp cypress, white cypress, tidewater red cypress, gulf cypress and red cypress.

The bald cypress was designated the official state tree of Louisiana in 1963.

Description

Taxodium distichum is a large, slow-growing, and long-lived tree.

The main trunk is often surrounded by cypress knees. The bark is grayish brown to reddish brown, thin, and fibrous with a stringy texture; it has a vertically, interwoven pattern of shallow ridges and narrow furrows.

In autumn, the leaves turn yellow or copper red. The bald cypress drops its needles each winter and then grows a new set in spring.

This species is monoecious, with male and female cones on a single plant forming on slender, tassel-like structures near the edge of branchlets. The tree produces cones in April and the seeds ripen in October. The male and female strobili are produced from buds formed in late autumn, with pollination in early winter, and mature in about 12 months. Male cones emerge on panicles that are  inches long. Female cones are round, resinous and green while young. They then turn hard and then brown as the tree matures. They have from 20 to 30 spirally arranged, four-sided scales, each bearing one, two, or rarely three triangular seeds. Each cone contains 20 to 40 large seeds. The cones disintegrate at maturity to release the seeds. The seedlings have three to nine, but usually six, cotyledons each. 

The bald cypress grows in full sunlight to partial shade. This species grows best in wet or well-drained soil but can tolerate dry soil. It is moderately able to grow in aerosols of salt water.  It does well in acid, neutral and alkaline soils across the full range of light (sandy), medium (loamy), and heavy (clay) soils.  It can also grow in saline soils. It can tolerate atmospheric pollution. The cones are often consumed by wildlife.

The tallest known specimen, near Williamsburg, Virginia, is 44.11 m (145 ft) tall, and the stoutest known, in the Real County near Leakey, Texas, has a circumference of 475 in (39 ft). The National Champion Bald Cypress is recognized as the largest member of its species in the country and is listed as such on the National Register of Champion Trees by American Forest. The oldest known living specimen, found along the Black River in North Carolina, is at least 2,624 years old, rendering it the oldest living tree in eastern North America. 

It was burned down accidentally by a drug addict in 2012.

"Big Dan" is one of the oldest living specimens and is found near High Springs, Florida at Camp Kulaqua.  It is estimated to be 2,704 years old as of 2020.  It is growing in the Hornsby Spring swamp run and is more than 35 feet in circumference.

Gallery

Taxonomy
The closely related Taxodium ascendens (pond cypress) is treated by some botanists as a distinct species, while others classify it as merely a variety of bald cypress, as Taxodium distichum var. imbricatum (Nutt.) Croom. It differs in shorter leaves borne on erect shoots, and in ecology, being largely confined to low-nutrient blackwater habitats. A few authors also treat Taxodium mucronatum as a variety of bald cypress, as T. distichum var. mexicanum Gordon, thereby considering the genus as comprising only one species.

Habitat and distribution

The native range extends from southeastern New Jersey south to Florida and west to Central Texas and southeastern Oklahoma, and also inland up the Mississippi River. Ancient bald cypress forests, with some trees more than 1,700 years old, once dominated swamps in the Southeast. The original range had been thought to only reach as far north as Delaware, but researchers have now found a natural forest on the Cape May Peninsula in southern New Jersey. The species can also be found growing outside its natural native range, in New York and Pennsylvania. 

The largest remaining old-growth stands are at Corkscrew Swamp Sanctuary, near Naples, Florida, and in the Three Sisters tract along eastern North Carolina's Black River. The Corkscrew trees are around 500 years of age, and some exceed 40 m in height. In 1985, the Black River trees were cored by dendrochronologist David Stahle from the University of Arkansas. He found that some began growing as early as 364 AD.  Returning to the area in 2019, Stahle discovered a tree dated by its tree-ring count to 605 B. C., ranking as the ninth-oldest tree in the world. 

Although it grows best in warm climates, the natural northern limit of the species is not due to a lack of cold tolerance, but to specific reproductive requirements: further north, regeneration is prevented by ice damage to seedlings. Larger trees are able to tolerate much lower temperatures and lower humidity.

In 2012 scuba divers discovered an underwater cypress forest several miles off the coast of Mobile, Alabama, in 60 feet of water. The forest contains trees that could not be dated with radiocarbon methods, indicating that they are more than 50,000 years old and thus most likely lived in the early glacial interval of the last ice age. The cypress forest is well preserved, and when samples are cut they still smell like fresh cypress. A team, which has not yet published its results in a peer-reviewed journal, is studying the site. One possibility is that hurricane Katrina exposed the grove of bald cypress, which had been protected under ocean floor sediments.

Reproduction and early growth

The bald cypress is monoecious. Male and female strobili mature in one growing season from buds formed the previous year. Pollen is shed in March and April. Female conelets are found singly or in clusters of two or three. The globose cones turn from green to brownish-purple as they mature from October to December. Each scale can bear two (rarely three) irregular, triangular seeds with thick, horny, warty coats and projecting flanges. The number of seeds per cone averages 16 and ranges from 2 to 34. Cleaned seeds number from about 5,600 to 18,430 per kg (2,540 to 8,360 per lb).

Seed production and dissemination
Some seeds are produced every year, and good seed crops occur at three- to five-year intervals. At maturity, the cone scales with their resin-coated seeds adhering to them, or sometimes entire cones, drop to the water or ground. This drop of mature seeds is often hastened by squirrels, which eat bald cypress seeds, but usually drop several scales with undamaged seeds still attached to each cone they pick. Floodwaters spread the scales or cones along streams and are the most important means of seed dissemination.

Seedling development
Germination is epigeal. Under swamp conditions, germination generally takes place on a sphagnum moss or a wet-muck seedbed. Seeds will not germinate under water, but some will remain viable for 30 months under water. By contrast, seeds usually fail to germinate on better drained soils because of the lack of surface water. Thus, a soil saturated but not flooded for a period of one to three months after seedfall is required for germination.

After germination, seedlings must grow fast enough to keep at least part of their crowns above floodwaters for most of the growing season. Bald cypress seedlings can endure partial shading, but require overhead light for good growth. Seedlings in swamps often reach heights of  their first year. Growth is checked when a seedling is completely submerged by flooding, and prolonged submergence kills the seedling.

In nurseries, Taxodium seeds show an apparent internal dormancy that can be overcome by various treatments, usually including cold stratification or submerging in water for 60 days. Nursery beds are sown in spring with pretreated seeds or in fall with untreated seeds. Seedlings usually reach  in height during their first (and usually only) year in the nursery.

Control of competing vegetation may be necessary for a year or more for bald cypress planted outside of swamps. Five years after planting on a harrowed and bedded, poorly drained site in Florida, survival was high, but heights had increased only , probably because of heavy herbaceous competition. Seedlings grown in a crawfish pond in Louisiana, where weed control and soil moisture were excellent through June, averaged  and  diameter at breast heigh after five years.

Vegetative reproduction

Bald cypress is one of the few conifer species that sprouts. Thrifty sprouts are generally produced from stumps of young trees, but trees up to 60 years old also send up healthy sprouts if the trees are cut during the fall or winter. However, survival of these sprouts is often poor, and those that live are usually poorly shaped and do not make quality saw timber trees. Stumps of trees up to 200 years old may also sprout, but the sprouts are not as vigorous and are more subject to wind damage as the stump decays. In the only report on the rooting of bald cypress cuttings found in the literature, cuttings from trees five years old rooted better than those from older trees.

Ecology

The seeds remain viable for less than one year, and are dispersed in two ways. One is by water: the seeds float and move on water until flooding recedes or the cone is deposited on shore. The second is by wildlife: squirrels eat seeds, but often drop some scales from the cones they harvest. Seeds do not germinate under water and rarely germinate on well-drained soils; seedlings normally become established on continuously saturated, but not flooded, soils for one to three months. After germination, seedlings must grow quickly to escape floodwaters; they often reach a height of 20–75 cm (up to 100 cm in fertilized nursery conditions) in their first year. Seedlings die if inundated for more than about two to four weeks. Natural regeneration is therefore prevented on sites that are always flooded during the growing season. Although vigorous saplings and stump sprouts can produce viable seed, most specimens do not produce seed until they are about 30 years old. In good conditions, bald cypress grows fairly fast when young, then more slowly with age. Trees have been measured to reach 3 m in five years, 21 m in 41 years, and 36 m in height in 96 years; height growth has largely ceased by the time the trees are 200 years old. Some individuals can live over 1,000 years. Determination of the age of an old tree may be difficult because of frequent missing or false rings of stemwood caused by variable and stressful growing environments.

Bald cypress trees growing in swamps have a peculiarity of growth called cypress knees. These are woody projections from the root system project above the ground or water. Their function was once thought to be to provide oxygen to the roots, which grow in the low dissolved oxygen waters typical of a swamp (as in mangroves). However, evidence for this is scant; in fact, roots of swamp-dwelling specimens whose knees are removed do not decrease in oxygen content and the trees continue to thrive. Another more likely function is structural support and stabilization. Bald cypress trees growing on flood-prone sites tend to form buttressed bases, but trees grown on drier sites may lack this feature. Buttressed bases and a strong, intertwined root system allow them to resist very strong winds; even hurricanes rarely overturn them.

Many agents damage T. distichum trees. The main damaging (in some cases lethal) agent is the fungus Lauriliella taxodii, which causes a brown pocket rot known as "pecky cypress." It attacks the heartwood of living trees, usually from the crown down to the roots. A few other fungi attack the sapwood and the heartwood of the tree, but they do not usually cause serious damage. Insects such as the cypress flea beetle (Systena marginalis) and the bald cypress leafroller (Archips goyerana) can seriously damage trees by destroying leaves, cones or bark. Nutrias also clip and unroot young bald cypress seedlings, sometimes killing a whole plantation in a short amount of time.

In 2002, the Indiana Department of Natural Resources identified T. distichum as a state protected plant with the status of Threatened. Globally, the species is listed as of Least Concern by the IUCN.

Cultivation and uses

The bald cypress is hardy and can be planted in hardiness zones 4 through 10 in the US. The species is a popular ornamental tree that is cultivated for its light, feathery foliage and orangey brown to dull red autumnal color. In cultivation it thrives on a wide range of soils, including well-drained sites where it would not grow naturally because juvenile seedlings cannot compete with other vegetation. Cultivation is successful far north of its native range, even to southern Canada. It is also commonly planted in Europe, Asia, and other temperate and subtropical locales. It does, however, require hot summers for good growth. 

When planted in locales with the cool summers of oceanic climates, growth is healthy but very slow; some specimens in northeastern England have only grown to 4–5 m tall in 50 years and do not produce cones. One of the oldest specimens in Europe was planted in the 1900s in the Arboretum de Pézanin in Burgundy, France.  An alley of Louisiana cypress trees was planted in the 18th century in the park of the Château de Rambouillet, southwest of Paris.

Bald cypress has great merchantable yields. In virgin stands, yields from 112 to 196 m³/ha were common, and some stands may have exceeded 1,000 m³/ha.

Building material
Still usable prehistoric wood is often found in swamps as far north as New Jersey, and occasionally as far north as Connecticut, although it is more common in the southeastern states. This partially mineralized wood is harvested from swamps in the southeastern states, and is greatly prized for special uses such as for carvings. The fungus Lauriliella taxodii causes a specific form of the wood called "pecky cypress", which is used for decorative wall paneling.

The bald cypress was used by Native Americans to create coffins, homes, drums and canoes. Joshua D. Brown, the first settler of Kerrville, Texas, made his living producing shingles from bald cypress trees that grew along the Guadalupe River of the Texas Hill Country. 

In the southern United States, the odorless wood, which closely resembles that of other Cupressus species, has been valued since colonial times for its resistance to water, making it ideal for use wherever the wood is exposed to the elements.  In the first half of the 20th century, it was marketed as "The Wood Eternal."

The lumber is valuable for timber framing, building materials, fence posts, planking in boats, river pilings, doors, blinds, flooring, shingles, garden boxes, caskets, interior trim and cabinetry. 

Bald cypress timbers are commonly available in lengths up to 24 feet. This species enjoys predictable lead times for projects. The wood is a very light tan in color and weathers to a uniform silvery gray. Paint and stains adhere well to Bald cypress. Bald cypress most often sees use in outdoor structures such as timber frame pavilions, mid-size farmers markets, porches, exterior awnings and decorative trusses where the species’ weather resistance helps ensure long life.

See also
 Saltwater swamp

References

External links

 The Ancient Bald Cypress Consortium
 Images of bald cypress trees and swamps
 Interactive Distribution Map for Taxodium distichum
 Photos of remarkable bald cypress trees worldwide
 Taxodium distichum - information, genetic conservation units and related resources. European Forest Genetic Resources Programme (EUFORGEN) 

distichum
Trees of the Eastern United States
Trees of the Southeastern United States
Trees of the South-Central United States
Plants used in bonsai
Ornamental trees
Least concern plants
Trees of the North-Central United States
Trees of the Southern United States
Deciduous conifers